Alfons Sampsted (born 6 April 1998) is an Icelandic professional footballer who plays as a right-back for Dutch club Twente.

Club career
Alfons started his career with local club Breiðablik in Kópavogur in 2015, playing a single cup game, before going on loan to Þór from Akureyri for the latter half of the season. In 2016, he played most of Breiðablik's games as they finished 6th in the 2016 Úrvalsdeild.

In January 2017, he was transferred to Swedish club IFK Norrköping. He spent three seasons there without ever cementing his place, spending time on loan at IF Sylvia and Landskrona BoIS in Sweden and Breiðablik in Iceland.

In February 2020, he joined Norwegian club Bodø/Glimt and was a key player in the 2020 season as the club won their first national title. There, he replaced former right back player Erlend Reitan who was on loan from Rosenborg.

On 27 December 2022, he joined Dutch club FC Twente.

International career
Alfons is as of 15 November 2020 the highest capped player of the Icelandic U21 national team with 30 games.

Career statistics

Club

Honours
Bodø/Glimt
Eliteserien: 2020, 2021

References

External links

Living people
1998 births
Alfons Sampsted
Association football fullbacks
Alfons Sampsted
Alfons Sampsted
Alfons Sampsted
Alfons Sampsted
IFK Norrköping players
Landskrona BoIS players
IF Sylvia players
FK Bodø/Glimt players
FC Twente players
Superettan players
Allsvenskan players
Ettan Fotboll players
Alfons Sampsted
Eliteserien players
Eredivisie players
Alfons Sampsted
Expatriate footballers in Sweden
Alfons Sampsted
Expatriate footballers in Norway
Alfons Sampsted
Expatriate footballers in the Netherlands
Alfons Sampsted
Alfons Sampsted
Iceland international footballers